Lampronia humilis is a moth of the family Prodoxidae. In North America it is found in the coastal areas of British Columbia south to northern California.

The wingspan is 10–14 mm. The forewings and hindwings are unicolorous grayish brown.

References

Moths described in 1888
Prodoxidae
Moths of North America